The 2001 Men's Oceania Cup was the second edition of the men's field hockey tournament. It was held from 10 to 13 May in Melbourne.

The tournament served as a qualifier for the 2002 FIH World Cup.

Australia won the tournament for the second time, defeating New Zealand in the three–game series, with two wins and one draw.

Results
All times are local (AEST).

Pool

Fixtures

Statistics

Final standings

Goalscorers

References

External links

2001
2001 in field hockey
2001 in Australian sport
2001 in New Zealand sport
2001 Oceania Cup
May 2001 sports events in Australia
Oceania Cup